Migonys is a village in the Kupiškis district municipality, Lithuania. According to the 2011 census, it had 106 inhabitants. The village celebrated its 400th anniversary in 1924. There is a hill-fort and 36 tumuli (28 survive) in the vicinity of the village.

18th century Lithuanian architect Laurynas Gucevičius was born in Migonys.

References
  

Villages in Panevėžys County
Tumuli